

References

Rwanda
Massacres
Massacres in Rwanda
Massacres